Button is an English surname. The name is generally held to be occupational, for people involved in making or selling buttons, a word derived from the Old French bo(u)ton. However, other origins are possible. For example, a family which produced three bishops and a baronetcy, see below under William Button, derived their name from the village of Bitton in South Gloucestershire. Notable people with the name include:

People:
Angie Chen Button (born 1954), American politician and business executive
Archibald Button (1770–unknown), English cricketer
Arthur Button (1916-1991), British Royal Air Force air vice-marshal
Arthur Button (cricketer) (1815-1870), English cricketer
Brian Button (born 1984), American professional wrestler and bodybuilder best known as Brian Cage
Charles Button (1838–1920), New Zealand lawyer, judge and politician
Craig Button (born 1963), former National Hockey League executive and current analyst for NHL Tonight
Craig D. Button (1964-1997), US Air Force pilot who crashed under strange circumstances
Daniel E. Button (1917-2009), US representative from New York
David Button (born 1989), English football goalkeeper
Dick Button (born 1929), American retired figure skater and television analyst
Ernest Button, New Zealand rugby league player in the 1910s
Fiona Button (born 1986), English stage and television actress
Ian Button (born 1962), English guitarist
Jack Button (1940-1996), National Hockey League executive
Jemmy Button (–1864), a native of Tierra del Fuego taken to England
Jen Button (born 1977), Canadian retired swimmer
Jenson Button (born 1980), Formula One racing driver
Jimmy Button (born 1973), American professional motocross racer
John Button (disambiguation)
Kenneth Button (physicist) (1922–2010), American physicist
Kenneth Button (born 1948), British transport expert and academic
Peter Button (–1987), New Zealand pioneering rescue helicopter pilot
Ralph Button (died 1680), English academic and clergyman
Robert Young Button (1899-1977), Attorney General of Virginia from 1945 to 1961.
A. Ronald Button (1903–1987), American politician and California State Treasurer
Stephen Decatur Button (1813-1897), American architect
Thomas Button, (died 1634), Welsh officer of the Royal Navy and explorer
William Button (disambiguation)
Zachariah Button, English amateur cricketer known to have played between 1793 and 1796

Fictional characters:
Benjamin Button, the title character of both The Curious Case of Benjamin Button (short story) and film
Ruby Button, from the soap opera Hollyoaks, played by Anna Shaffer
Duncan Button, (brother of Ruby), from Hollyoaks, played by Dean Aspen

See also 
Button (disambiguation)

References